Athikkadai is a village in the Tiruvarur district in Tamil Nadu, India. As of the 2011 Indian census, Athikkadai had 3,848 inhabitants. Out of this number, 1,791 were males, while 2,057 were females.

References

External links 
 Welcome to Athikkadai

Villages in Tiruvarur district